Abaeté is a municipality in the north of the Brazilian state of Minas Gerais. In 2020, the population was 23,250 in a total area of 1,816 square kilometers. It became a municipality in 1870.

Location
Abaeté belongs to the statistical micro-region of Três Marias. It is located at an elevation of 641 meters between the São Francisco River and the Indaiá River.  Neighboring municipalities are:
North: Paineiras and Morada Nova de Minas.
West: Cedro do Abaeté.
South: Quartel Geral .
Southeast: Pompéu and Martinho Campos.

Distances
Pompeu: 53 kilometers away.
São Gotardo: 75 kilometers away.
Belo Horizonte: 213 kilometers away.

Etymology
Abaeté, of Tupi-Guarani origin, means strong man or brave man and was the word by which the local natives called themselves. The first name of the settlement was Nossa Senhora das Dores do Marmelada.

Economy
The most important economic activities are cattle raising, commerce and agriculture. The GDP in 2005 was R$162 million, of which, 89 million came from services. Abaeté is in the top tier of municipalities in the state with regard to economic and social development. In 2007 there were three banking agencies in the town. There was a small retail infrastructure serving the surrounding area of cattle and agricultural lands. In 2007, there were 3,629 automobiles in all of the municipality, about one for every six inhabitants.

In 2007, in the rural area, there were 989 establishments occupying 136,000 hectares. About 2,500 persons were employed in agriculture. 264 of the municipality's farms had tractors, a ratio of one in four farms. There were 87,000 head of cattle in 2006, of which, 16,000 head were dairy cows. In permanent crops,  there were 4,400 hectares planted, while in perennial crops, 4,700 hectares were planted. The crops with a planted area of more than 200 hectares were sugarcane and corn.

Health and education
In the health sector, there were 13 health clinics and one hospital with 60 beds. In the educational sector, there were 10 primary schools and two middle schools.

Municipal Human Development Index: 0.778 (2000)
State ranking: 125 out of 853 municipalities in 2000
National ranking: 1,110 out of 5,138 municipalities in 2000 
Literacy rate: 87%
Life expectancy: 72 (average of males and females)

See also
 List of municipalities in Minas Gerais

References

Municipalities in Minas Gerais
Populated places established in 1870
1870 establishments in Brazil